EWI may refer to:

 EWI (musical instrument), an electronic wind instrument
 EastWest Institute, an American think tank
 Edison Welding Institute, in Ohio, United States
 Enarotali Airport, in Indonesia
 Energiewirtschaftliches Institut, an economics research institute at the University of Cologne
 Expert Witness Institute 
 External wall insulation